Sidran is a surname. Notable people with the surname include:

Abdulah Sidran (born 1944), a Bosnian writer and poet
Ben Sidran (born 1943), an American jazz pianist
Leo Sidran (born 1976), an American musician, composer, performer, and producer, son of Ben Sidran
Mark Sidran (born 1951), former Seattle City Attorney

Bosnian surnames